Petroana is a genus of flowering plants belonging to the family Caryophyllaceae.

Its native range is Southeastern Spain, Northeastern Tropical Africa, Arabian Peninsula.

Species:

Petroana montana 
Petroana montserratii

References

Caryophyllaceae
Caryophyllaceae genera